Bakdash may refer to:

 Bakdash (ice cream parlor), in Damascus, Syria
 Khalid Bakdash, leader of the Syrian Communist Party from 1936